Summersville Lake is a reservoir located in the US state of West Virginia. The lake is formed by a rock-fill dam (Summersville Dam) on the Gauley River, south of Summersville in Nicholas County. Its maximum depth is 327 feet.

Dam

The lake was constructed between 1960 and 1966 by the United States Army Corps of Engineers in order to control flooding in an  watershed along the Gauley River and the Kanawha River. President Lyndon B. Johnson dedicated both the dam and a new Summersville Post Office on September 3, 1966.

Hydroelectric project
In 2001, a two-year project was completed to harness the dam outflow for hydroelectric power generation.  The power plant has a capacity to generate 80-\ megawatts of electricity at peak flow.

Recreation 
The lake also serves as a recreation area for fishing, boating, and rock climbing, as well as snorkeling and scuba diving. It serves as the eastern (upstream) end of Gauley River National Recreation Area. There is a small boat under the lake that was intentionally sunk to give divers something to view while scuba diving. Beyond the bridge that Route 19 crosses over the lake is a no-wake zone for casual boating. Located on the cliffs of Summersville Lake is the only working lighthouse in West Virginia, the Summersville Lake Lighthouse. Cliff Jumping has been banned at Summersville Lake since 2007.

Gallery

References

External links 

 Summersville Lake water levels and out follow
 Army Corps of Engineers Summersville Lake site
 Engineering firm responsible for the powerplant
 Enel North America operates the powerplant

Bodies of water of Nicholas County, West Virginia
Reservoirs in West Virginia
Dams in West Virginia
United States Army Corps of Engineers, Huntington District
Hydroelectric power plants in West Virginia
United States Army Corps of Engineers dams
Dams completed in 1966
Energy infrastructure completed in 1966
1966 establishments in West Virginia
IUCN Category V